Logperches are a group of fish in the genus Percina of the family Percidae.         

There are 11 species of logperch, native to eastern parts of the US and Canada. Percina caprodes is the most widespread of the species; some of the species with more restricted distribution are threatened in various ways. Due to their small size, the fish are not normally harvested for food. Habitat alteration and inappropriate land use practices are the most common population stressors.

Species
Percina austroperca – Southern logperch
Percina bimaculata – Chesapeake logperch (often included in P. caprodes)
Percina burtoni – Blotchside logperch
Percina caprodes – Common logperch (or simply "Logperch")
Percina carbonaria (Baird & Girard, 1853) – Texas logperch
Percina fulvitaenia Morris & Page, 1981 – Ozark logperch
Percina jenkinsi – Conasauga logperch
Percina kathae Thompson, 1997 – Mobile logperch
Percina macrolepida Stevenson, 1971 – Bigscale logperch
Percina rex – Roanoke logperch
Percina suttkusi Thompson, 1997 – Gulf logperch

 
Fish common names